Diana Muir, also known as Diana Muir Appelbaum, is a Newton, Massachusetts, USA, historian best known for her 2000 book Reflections in Bullough's Pond, a history of the impact of human activity on the New England ecosystem.

Personal life
Appelbaum was born on base at Fort Belvoir, Virginia. Her father was in the army and the family lived in several states before settling in the small town of Old Lyme, Connecticut, when she was entering 11th grade. She won an AFS Intercultural Programs scholarship and spent a year in Llay-Llay, Chile, before graduating from Old Lyme High School. She attended Barnard College of Columbia University in New York City.  Her parents are Elizabeth Carmen (née Whitman) and the nuclear engineer Peter Karter (né Patayonis Karteroulis). Her paternal grandparents were Greek. Her sister is the entrepreneur Trish Karter. She is married to Paul S. Appelbaum, a psychiatrist and professor at Columbia University with whom she has co-authored articles. They have three adult children, Binyamin Appelbaum, Yoni Appelbaum and Avigail Appelbaum.

Reflections in Bullough's Pond 
According to the Daily News Tribune, "Muir's book Reflections in Bullough's Pond reads more like a novel than a history book. In the book, Muir shows the historical relationship between New England's economy and the environment. She expands the relationship into a national and global analysis of America's, and the world's, current environmental and political problems: global warming, ozone depletion, and Middle East oil dependence, to name a few. Muir claims America's oil dependent economy has hit a dead end. Muir argues that Americans can, and must, make economic changes to alleviate their environmental and political problems."

Muir draws on many academic disciplines in her work. As the Boston Globe put it:

Environmentalism
Muir, an environmental historian, is a critic of American choice of "profitability over sustainability". She has been called "Malthusian", and a "shameless environmentalist". She has written a column for the Massachusetts Sierran, the magazine of the Massachusetts Sierra Club.

Works
Muir is the author of two acclaimed picture books for children, Giants in the Land and Cocoa Ice.

She has published a number of articles on genetics and ethnicity, defending the position that ethnicity is a matter of language and customs, not genetic descent.

Muir is the author of histories of the Fourth of July and Thanksgiving. The sociologist Amitai Etzioni has called Muir's books key works in the social history of holidays.

Selected publications

Books
 Reflections in Bullough's Pond; Economy and Ecosystem in New England
 Thanksgiving; an American Holiday
 The Glorious Fourth; An American Holiday

Books for children
 Cocoa Ice
 Giants in the Land

Articles
 
 "The Gene Wars", with Paul S. Appelbaum, Azure, Winter 5767 / 2007, No. 27
 "A Land without a People for a People without a Land", Middle Eastern Quarterly, Spring 2008, vol. 15, no. 2
 
 "Jewish Identity and Egyptian Revival Architecture", Journal of Jewish Identities, summer 2012

References

External links
 

Year of birth missing (living people)
Living people
21st-century American novelists
American women novelists
Barnard College alumni
Writers from Newton, Massachusetts
Historians of the United States
American women historians
21st-century American women writers
Novelists from Massachusetts
21st-century American historians
21st-century American essayists
Historians from Massachusetts